Black Christmas may refer to:

Black Christmas (1974 film), a Canadian slasher horror film
Black Christmas (2006 film), the first remake of the 1974 film
Black Christmas (2019 film), the second remake of the 1974 film
 Black Christmas boycott, a 1963 economic boycott of businesses in Greenville, North Carolina
Black Christmas bushfires, a 2001–2002 brushfire in New South Wales, Australia
Black Christmas (Hong Kong), the surrender after the Battle of Hong Kong in 1941

See also
Dark Christmas, a 2009 album by Abney Park